Arthur Schmaehl (February 5, 1894 – December 20, 1967) was an American football fullback in the National Football League who played for the Green Bay Packers.  Schmaehl played professional football for one season in the NFL.

References

1894 births
1967 deaths
People from Milwaukee County, Wisconsin
Players of American football from Wisconsin
Green Bay Packers players